Co-codaprin (BAN) is a non-proprietary name used to denote a compound analgesic, a combination of codeine phosphate with aspirin.

Co-codaprin tablets are used for mild to moderate pain.

Preparations

Canada
AC&C is a preparation of aspirin, codeine phosphate and caffeine in tablet form. The caffeine is intended to counteract drowsiness which may be caused by the codeine.

AC&C is available in different formulations containing varying amounts of codeine. Formulations containing 8 mg or less of codeine ("AC&C 8" or "222") are typically available from pharmacies over the counter. A prescription is not required, but the medication must be requested from the pharmacist. The "222" and higher numbers refer to the codeine narcotic content numbers as follows:
 222 - contains 7.5 mg codeine
 282 - contains 15 mg codeine
 292 - contains 30 mg codeine
 293 - contains 60 mg codeine

See also
Co-dydramol
Co-codamol
Co-proxamol

References

Opiates
Combination analgesics